This is a list of episodes of the South Korean variety-music show King of Mask Singer in 2016. The show airs on MBC as part of their Sunday Night lineup. The names listed below are in performance order.

 – Contestant is instantly eliminated by the live audience and judging panel
 – After being eliminated, contestant performs a prepared song for the next round and takes off their mask during the instrumental break
 – After being eliminated and revealing their identity, contestant has another special performance
 – Contestant advances to the next round
 – Contestant becomes the challenger
 – Mask King

Episodes

20th Generation Mask King (cont.)

Contestants : Lim Jeong-hee, Jo Hye-ryun, Kim Nam-joo (Apink), Kihyun (Monsta X), Lee Pil-mo, Jeon Woo-sung (Noel)

Episode 40

Episode 40 was broadcast on January 3, 2016.

21st Generation Mask King

Contestants : , Ryeowook (Super Junior), Jay Park, Kim Jin-woo, Sunyoul (UP10TION), KCM, Dana (The Grace)

Episode 41

Episode 41 was broadcast on January 10, 2016. This marks the beginning of the Twenty-first Generation.

Episode 42

Episode 42 was broadcast on January 17, 2016.

22nd Generation Mask King

Contestants : Kim Yong-jun (SG Wannabe),  (The Jadu), Jun. K (2PM), Ha Hyun-woo (Guckkasten), Park Ji-woo, Wendy (Red Velvet), Ahn Se-ha

Episode 43

Episode 43 was broadcast on January 24, 2016. This marks the beginning of the Twenty-second Generation.

Episode 44

Episode 44 was broadcast on January 31, 2016.

23rd Generation Mask King

Contestants : Niel (Teen Top), Lizzy (After School/Orange Caramel), Jo Kwanwoo, Yang Geum-seok, Kangin (Super Junior), Tei

Episode 45

Episode 45 was broadcast on February 7, 2016. This marks the beginning of the Twenty-third Generation.

Episode 46

Episode 46 was broadcast on February 14, 2016.

24th Generation Mask King

Episode 47

Episode 47 was broadcast on February 21, 2016. This marks the beginning of the Twenty-fourth Generation.

Episode 48

Episode 48 was broadcast on February 28, 2016.

25th Generation Mask King

Contestants : , Hyolyn (Sistar), Leo (VIXX),  (V.O.S), Kang Dong-ho

Episode 49

Episode 49 was broadcast on March 6, 2016. This marks the beginning of the Twenty-fifth Generation.

Episode 50

Episode 50 was broadcast on March 13, 2016.

26th Generation Mask King

Contestants : Song So-hee, Shim Mina, Kang Joon-woo, Choi Sung-won, Kim Jeong-hoon (UN), Kim Bo-hyung (SPICA), Lee Jong-beom

Episode 51

Episode 51 was broadcast on March 20, 2016. This marks the beginning of the Twenty-sixth Generation.

Episode 52

Episode 52 was broadcast on March 27, 2016.

27th Generation Mask King

Contestants : Lee Min-woo (Shinhwa), Choi Phillip, Han Dong-geun, HEYNE, Choi Hyun-seok, Tim, Yoon Yoo-sun, WoongSan

Episode 53

Episode 53 was broadcast on April 3, 2016. This marks the beginning of the Twenty-seventh Generation.

Episode 54

Episode 54 was broadcast on April 10, 2016.

28th Generation Mask King

Contestants : Wheein (Mamamoo), Onejunn (Boys Republic),  (Ulala Session), Yesung (Super Junior), Shoo (S.E.S.), Son Byong-ho

Episode 55

Episode 55 was broadcast on April 17, 2016. This marks the beginning of the Twenty-eighth Generation.

Episode 56

Episode 56 was broadcast on April 24, 2016.

29th Generation Mask King

Contestants : Lee Yoon-mi, Kim Hyun-sook, Kim Tae-woo (g.o.d), Sleepy (Untouchable), Lee Hyun-woo, Yangpa, Hwang Seung-eon

Episode 57

Episode 57 was broadcast on May 1, 2016. This marks the beginning of the Twenty-ninth Generation.

Episode 58

Episode 58 was broadcast on May 8, 2016.

30th Generation Mask King

Contestants : Park Bo-ram, Subin (Dal Shabet), Kim Kiri, Kim Min-seok, Oh Chang-seok, Jo Sung-hwan, Kim Kyung-ho

Episode 59

Episode 59 was broadcast on May 15, 2016. This marks the beginning of the Thirtieth Generation.

Episode 60

Episode 60 was broadcast on May 22, 2016.

31st Generation Mask King

Contestants :  (V.O.S), Kang Ji-sub, Yoon Bo-mi (Apink), Bada (S.E.S.), Seo Shin-ae, Yoo Seung-woo, Yoon Hong-hyun (Big Brain), The One

Episode 61

Episode 61 was broadcast on May 29, 2016. This marks the beginning of the Thirty-first Generation.

Episode 62

Episode 62 was broadcast on June 5, 2016.

32nd Generation Mask King

Contestants : Hyelin (EXID), Crush, L (INFINITE), Park Jae-jung,  (No Brain), Seomoon Tak, Son Jin-young, Lee Sang-min (Roo'ra)

Episode 63

Episode 63 was broadcast on June 12, 2016. This marks the beginning of the Thirty-second Generation.

Episode 64

Episode 64 was broadcast on June 19, 2016.

33rd Generation Mask King

Contestants : , Stephanie (The Grace),  (Urban Zakapa), Exy (Cosmic Girls), Roy Kim, Kim Bo-sung, Kang Sung-hoon (Sechs Kies)

Episode 65

Episode 65 was broadcast on June 26, 2016. This marks the beginning of the Thirty-third Generation.

Episode 66

Episode 66 was broadcast on July 3, 2016.

34th Generation Mask King

Contestants : , Boom,  (Sweet Sorrow), Esther (에스더), Park Ha-na, Eunha (GFriend), Rumble Fish (singer) (Rumble Fish), Lee Jae-yong

Episode 67

Episode 67 was broadcast on July 10, 2016. This marks the beginning of the Thirty-fourth Generation.

Episode 68

Episode 68 was broadcast on July 17, 2016.

35th Generation Mask King

Contestants : Son Hoyoung (g.o.d), Jihyo (Twice), DK (SEVENTEEN), JeA (Brown Eyed Girls), Kim Yeon-ji (SeeYa), Seo Yu-ri

Episode 69

Episode 69 was broadcast on July 24, 2016. This marks the beginning of the Thirty-fifth Generation.

Episode 70

Episode 70 was broadcast on July 31, 2016.

36th Generation Mask King

Contestants : Hong Jong-goo, Kim Shin-eui (Monni), Lady Jane, Jungkook (BTS), Bong Man-dae, Chung Dong-ha

Episode 71

Episode 71 was broadcast on August 7, 2016. This marks the beginning of the Thirty-sixth Generation.

Episode 72

Episode 72 will be broadcast on August 14, 2016.

37th Generation Mask King

Contestants : Hwayobi, Yoon Hae-young, Heo Young-saeng (SS501/Double S 301), Lee Won-seok (Daybreak), Jeong Jinwoon (2AM), Woo Ji-won, 

Episode 73

Episode 73 was broadcast on August 21, 2016. This marks the beginning of the Thirty-seventh Generation.

Episode 74

Episode 74 was broadcast on August 28, 2016.

38th Generation Mask King

Contestants : Horan (Clazziquai Project), Gyeongree (Nine Muses), Seo Eunkwang (BtoB), Heo Jung-min, Kim Tae-hyun (DickPunks), Kai, 

Episode 75

Episode 75 was broadcast on September 4, 2016. This marks the beginning of the Thirty-eighth Generation.

Episode 76

Episode 76 was broadcast on September 11, 2016.

39th Generation Mask King

Contestants : CNU (B1A4), Solbi, Huh Gak, Kim So-yeon, NC.A, Lee Jae-hoon (Cool), 

Episode 77

Episode 77 was broadcast on September 18, 2016. This marks the beginning of the Thirty-ninth Generation.

Episode 78

Episode 78 was broadcast on September 25, 2016.

40th Generation Mask King

Contestants : Choi Jung-won, Bae Jong-ok, Ahn Ji-hwan, Kwak Hee-sung, Yeeun (Wonder Girls), Seulgi (Red Velvet), Ali

Episode 79

Episode 79 was broadcast on October 2, 2016. This marks the beginning of the Fortieth Generation.

Episode 80

Episode 80 was broadcast on October 9, 2016.

Special Live 2016: Your Choice! King of Mask Singer

Contestants : Sandeul (B1A4), Dana (The Grace), Hyun Jin-young, KCM, Lee Ji-hoon, Younha, Lim Jeong-hee

The special live broadcast aired on October 5, 2016, as part of the DMC Festival. This was a special edition That brought back contestants That had been eliminated in previous episodes, and a special Mask King was chosen from live voting. Sandeul was able to perform as a challenger in Episode 84.

41st Generation Mask King

Contestants : Soyou (Sistar), Seo Ha-joon, Lee Jin-sung (Monday Kiz), Lee Ji-hye (S#arp), Park Jin-joo, Lee Sun-bin

Episode 81

Episode 81 was broadcast on October 16, 2016. This marks the beginning of the Forty-first Generation.

Episode 82

Episode 82 was broadcast on October 23, 2016.

42nd Generation Mask King

Contestants : So Chan-whee, Youjin (KNK), Baek A-yeon, Lee Won-hee, Kim Dong-myung (Boohwal), Park Soo-hong, Dongjun (ZE:A)

Episode 83

Episode 83 was broadcast on October 30, 2016. This marks the beginning of the Forty-second Generation.

Episode 84

Episode 84 was broadcast on November 6, 2016. "Heart Attack Cupid", who was Mask King of the special live broadcast (aired October 5, 2016), participated in the final battle with the Forty-first Generation Mask King and the Challenger.

43rd Generation Mask King

Contestants : Monika (Badkiz), Jota (Madtown), Kim Hyun-jung, Park Kyung-seo, Im Ho, Jinyoung (B1A4),  (4Men)

Episode 85

Episode 85 was broadcast on November 13, 2016. This marks the beginning of the Forty-third Generation.

Episode 86

Episode 86 was broadcast on November 20, 2016.

44th Generation Mask King

Contestants : Cao Lu (Fiestar), Kim Wan-sun, Kim Na-young, Choi Min-yong, Lim Seul-ong (2AM), Shin Bong-sun, Kim Sa-rang, Park Wan-kyu

Episode 87

Episode 87 was broadcast on November 27, 2016. This marks the beginning of the Forty-fourth Generation.

Episode 88

Episode 88 was broadcast on December 4, 2016.

45th Generation Mask King

Episode 89

Episode 89 was broadcast on December 11, 2016. This marks the beginning of the Forty-fifth Generation.

Episode 90

Episode 90 was broadcast on December 18, 2016.

46th Generation Mask King

Contestants : Heo Kyung-hwan, Yoo Yeon-jung (I.O.I/Cosmic Girls), Jung Seung-hwan, Kim Hyun-jung,  (EVE),  (Ulala Session), Ji So-yun

Episode 91 was broadcast on December 25, 2016. This marks the beginning of the Forty-sixth Generation.

References 

Lists of King of Mask Singer episodes
Lists of variety television series episodes
Lists of South Korean television series episodes
2016 in South Korean television